Carlos Emilio Orrantia Treviño (born 1 February 1991), also known as El Charal, is a Mexican professional  footballer who plays as a right-back for Liga MX club Toluca.

Club career
In December 2015, Puebla signed Orrantia on loan from Santos Laguna.

Honours
UNAM
Mexican Primera División: Clausura 2011

Santos Laguna
Liga MX: Clausura 2015
Campeón de Campeones: 2015

Mexico Youth
CONCACAF U-20 Championship: 2011
Pan American Games: 2011

References

1991 births
Living people
Footballers from Mexico City
Mexican people of Basque descent
Footballers at the 2011 Pan American Games
Liga MX players
Club Universidad Nacional footballers
Deportivo Toluca F.C. players
Santos Laguna footballers
Club Puebla players
Club América footballers
2011 Copa América players
Association football midfielders
Mexico youth international footballers
Mexico under-20 international footballers
Pan American Games gold medalists for Mexico
Pan American Games medalists in football
Mexican footballers
Medalists at the 2011 Pan American Games